Chlidonia is a genus of bryozoans belonging to the order Cheilostomatida. It is the only genus in the family Chlidoniidae.

References

Cheilostomatida
Bryozoan genera